Ballaarat New Cemetery is a cemetery located in the rural city of Ballarat, Victoria in Australia. The cemetery dates back to 1867.

Notable Interments
 James Esmond, gold miner
 Brother Paul Nunan, educationalist
 F. W. Commons, monumental mason, and sculptor of many of the headstones in the cemetery

War graves
The cemetery contains the war graves of 56 Commonwealth service personnel. There are 24 from World War I and 32 from World War II.

Note
The archaic spelling of Ballaarat has been used as on the official Ballaarat General Cemeteries website.

See also
 Ballaarat Old Cemetery

References

External links
 Ballarat New Cemetery – Billion Graves
 Ballarat New General Cemetery Australian cemeteries
 

1867 establishments in Australia
Cemeteries in Victoria (Australia)
Ballarat